3T3 cells are several cell lines of mouse embryonic fibroblasts. The original 3T3 cell line (3T3-Swiss albino) was established in 1962 by two scientists then at the Department of Pathology in the New York University School of Medicine, George Todaro and Howard Green. Todaro and Green originally obtained their 3T3 cells from Swiss albino mouse embryo tissue. After landing a principal investigator position at the National Cancer Institute in Bethesda, Maryland, Tadaro repeated the isolation procedure from the NIH Swiss mouse embryo with his students and established NIH-3T3 cell line.

Nomenclature
The '3T3' designation refers to the abbreviation of "3-day transfer, inoculum  cells."  This cell line was originally established from the primary mouse embryonic fibroblast cells that were cultured by the designated protocol, so-called '3T3 protocol'.  The primary mouse embryonic fibroblast cells were transferred (the "T") every 3 days (the first "3"), and inoculated at the rigid density of  cells per 20 cm2 dish (the second "3") continuously. The spontaneously immortalized cells with stable growth rate were established after 20 to 30 generations in culture, and then named '3T3' cells. Since then, several cell lines have been established with this procotol:
3T3-Swiss albino, the original 1962 cell line
3T3-J2, a subclone of 3T3-Swiss albino, commonly used as feeders for keratinocyte cultures
3T3-L1, a subclone of 3T3-Swiss albino, used as a model of adipogenesis
NIH-3T3, also from Swiss albino mice
BALB/c-3T3 clone A31, from BALB/c mice

Characteristics
Swiss 3T3 can be inhibited by temazepam and other benzodiazepines. These cells are also contact inhibited. The cells are sensitive to sarcoma virus and leukemia virus focus formation. 3T3 cells can be transformed with SV40 and some other polyomaviruses.

Culture characteristics 
Adherent cells grow as a monolayer. A confluent monolayer yields 40000 cells/cm2.

Expression 
Lysophosphatidylcholine (lyso-PC) induces AP-1 activity and c-jun N-terminal kinase activity (JNK1) by a protein kinase C-independent pathway.

Cytogenetics
3T3 mouse cells are hypertriploid. The modal chromosome number is 68, which occurs in 30% of cells. Higher ploidies occur at a much lower rate of 2.4%.

References

External links      
                                                        
Cellosaurus entry for NIH 3T3
Cellosaurus entry for 3T3-Swiss Albino
Nikon MicroscopyU Digital Video Gallery: 3T3 Cell Motility - a set of films of 3T3 cells in culture

Non-terminally differentiated (blast) cells
Rodent cell lines
Alternatives to animal testing